In feudal law, nulle terre sans seigneur (French for "no land without (a) lord") is the principle that one provides services to the sovereign (usually serving in his army) for the right to receive land from the sovereign.  Originally a maxim of feudal law, it applies in modern form to paying rates or land tax for land of former feudal or feudal-like origin such as land with modern fee simple title, as opposed to land with allodial or udal title.

In the original French the expression means "No land without a lord" though the legal sense might be more akin to "no property without a liege" since it was at the basis of the link between the infeodated or feal and his liege, in the feudal system.

See also
History of English land law
Aboriginal title

References

Economic systems
Feudalism
Medieval law
Nobility
Social classes
Medieval economics